Ischnognatha is a genus of moths in the family Erebidae. The genus was described by Felder in 1874.

Species
Ischnognatha leucapera
Ischnognatha semiopalina

References

External links

Phaegopterina
Moth genera